Akplabanya is a fishing community in the Ada West District in the Greater Accra Region of Ghana. The Akplabanya lagoon is located in the community.

References 

Greater Accra Region
Communities in Ghana